Alice Skye is an Australian singer and songwriter. She is a Wergaia woman from Horsham.

In 2017, she was the Triple J Unearthed National Indigenous Winner.

She released her debut album Friends with Feelings in 2018 and toured nationally with Emily Wurramara.

Discography

Studio albums

Singles

Guest appearances

Awards and nominations

Australian Women in Music Awards
The Australian Women in Music Awards is an annual event that celebrates outstanding women in the Australian Music Industry who have made significant and lasting contributions in their chosen field. They commenced in 2018.

! 
|-
! scope="row"| 2019
| Herself
| Emerging Artist Award
| 
| 
|}

Music Victoria Awards
The Music Victoria Awards, are an annual awards night celebrating Victorian music. They commenced in 2005.

! 
|-
! scope="row" rowspan="2"| 2020
| rowspan="2"| Herself
| Best Breakthrough Act
| 
| rowspan="2"| 
|-
| The Archie Roach Foundation Award for Emerging Talent
| 
|-
! scope="row" rowspan="2"| 2021
| "Party Tricks"
| Best Victorian Song
| 
| rowspan="2"| 
|-
| Herself
| Best Pop Act
| 
|-
| 2022
| Alice Skye
| Best Regional Act
| 
| 
|-
|}

National Indigenous Music Awards
The National Indigenous Music Awards recognise excellence, innovation and leadership among Aboriginal and Torres Strait Islander musicians from throughout Australia.

! 
|-
! scope="row"| 2020
| "I Feel Better but I Don't Feel Good"
| Song of the Year
| 
| 
|}

References

1990s births
Bad Apples Music artists
Indigenous Australian musicians
Living people
Year of birth missing (living people)